Lise Blouin (born September 11, 1944) is a Quebec educator and novelist.

Biography 
She was born in Saint-Isidore-d'Auckland in Quebec's Eastern Townships and studied at the Université de Sherbrooke, receiving a BEd and a BA. 

Blouin worked as an adult education teacher while pursuing her writing career.

She received the Prix littéraire Esso du Cercle du livre de France for her novel Miroir à deux visages, published in 1981. In 1993, she received the Prix Gaston-Gouin for L'absente. Her novel L'Or des fous received both the Prix Alfred-Desrochers in 2004 and the Prix du roman d'amour Prince-Maurice in 2005.

Blouin has also written a number of educational works, mainly for adult students.

References 

1944 births
Living people
20th-century Canadian novelists
21st-century Canadian novelists
Canadian women novelists
Writers from Quebec
People from Estrie
21st-century Canadian women writers
20th-century Canadian women writers
Canadian novelists in French